Lacona Clock Tower is a historic clock tower located at Lacona in Oswego County, New York.  It was built in 1925 and is a freestanding three-tier red brick tower with a square plan and pyramidal roof.  The second stage features the working electric clock and third stage a belfry containing the village bell.

It was listed on the National Register of Historic Places in 1988.

References

External links
Lacona Memory Wreath to fund Clock Tower repair

Buildings and structures on the National Register of Historic Places in New York (state)
Towers completed in 1925
Buildings and structures in Oswego County, New York
Clock towers in New York (state)
National Register of Historic Places in Oswego County, New York